Adams
 Amesbury
 Athol
 Attleboro
 Chicopee
 Clinton
 Dalton
 Dedham
 Fall River
 Fitchburg
 Framingham
 Gardner
 Grafton
 Greenfield
 Haverhill
 Holyoke
 Hopedale
 Hudson
 Lawrence
 Lowell
 Ludlow
 Lynn
 Maynard
 Merrimac
 Methuen
 Milford
 Millbury
 Monson
 New Bedford
 North Adams
 North Andover
 Northbridge
 Orange
 Palmer
 Pittsfield
 Rowley
 Russell
 Southbridge
 Taunton
 Uxbridge
 Waltham
 Ware
 Webster
 Westborough
 Westford
 Winchendon
 Worcester

Mill villages and districts in Massachusetts

 Acushnet Heights Historic District – historic village district in New Bedford
 Ballardvale, Massachusetts – a village in Andover
 Bondsville, Massachusetts – a village in Palmer
 Bradford, Massachusetts – a village in Haverhill
 Brookside, Massachusetts – a village in Westford
 Cabotville Common Historic District – a historic mill district in Chicopee
 Central New Bedford Historic District – historic village district in New Bedford
 Church Street Historic District – located in Ware
 Dwight Manufacturing Company Housing District – a historic mill district in Chicopee
 Farnumsville Historic District – unincorporated mill village in Grafton
 Fisherville Historic District – unincorporated mill village in Grafton
 Forge Village, Massachusetts – a village in Westford
 Gilbertville, Massachusetts – a village in Hardwick
 Graniteville, Massachusetts – a village in Westford
 Hamilton Woolen Company Historic District – historic mill district in Southbridge
 Howland Mill Village Historic District – historic village district in New Bedford
 Indian Orchard, now a neighborhood of Springfield. The remainder of Springfield was never a "mill town," but rather oriented toward precision manufacturing, (e.g. the Springfield Armory.)
 Ironstone, Massachusetts (also known as South Uxbridge) – a historic village in Uxbridge
 Linwood, Massachusetts – mill village in Northbridge
 North Uxbridge, Massachusetts – a village within Uxbridge
 North Chelmsford, Massachusetts – a historic mill district within Chelmsford, Massachusetts
 North Billerica, Massachusetts – a historic mill district within Billerica, Massachusetts
 Rogerson's Village Historic District – a historic mill district in Uxbridge
 South Barre, Massachusetts – a village in Barre 
 Turners Falls, Massachusetts – a village in Montague, Massachusetts
 Three Rivers, Massachusetts – a village in Palmer
 Upton-West Upton, Massachusetts – home to Knowlton Hat Factory
 Ware Millyard Historic District – a historic district located in Ware
 Weir Village, Massachusetts – a village in Taunton
 Wheelockville, Massachusetts and the Wheelockville District – located within Uxbridge
 Whitinsville, Massachusetts – mill village in Northbridge

See also
Mill town
Lowell Mill Girls
Industrial Revolution

Mills
Mills
Mills
Mill towns
Massachusetts